"Gens du pays" has been called the unofficial national anthem of Quebec.  Written by poet and singer-songwriter Gilles Vigneault (with music co-written by Gaston Rochon), it was first performed by Vigneault on June 24, 1975 during a concert on Montreal's Mount Royal at that year's Fête nationale du Québec ceremony.  It quickly became a folk classic, and it has been played frequently at Fête nationale ceremonies since then. The chorus is by far the most famous part of the song: Gens du pays, c'est votre tour / De vous laisser parler d'amour, which, translated, says, "Folks of the land, it is your turn to let yourselves speak of love."

The song is also associated with the Quebec sovereignty movement and the sovereigntist Parti Québécois, which use it as a sort of anthem. A famous instance of this took place at René Lévesque's concession speech after the citizens of the province rejected independence in the 1980 Quebec referendum. At the end of Lévesque's speech, the crowd assembled to hear him speak stood up at the end of the speech and sang "Gens du pays", which Lévesque called "the most beautiful Québécois song in the minds of all Quebecers."

Birthday adaptation 
In Quebec, a modified version of the chorus is often sung to celebrate a person, for example on a birthday (in the specific case of the birthday, the idea was explicitly introduced by Gilles Vigneault, Yvon Deschamps and Louise Forestier at the song's 1975 introduction):

Mon cher ami (or Ma chère amie), c'est à ton tour
De te laisser parler d'amour.

("My dear friend, it's your turn / To let yourself be lovingly spoken to.")

Alternatively, "ami(e)" (friend) is replaced with the name of the person being celebrated.

For instance, at René Lévesque's funeral, mourners outside the church broke out singing "Mon cher René, c'est à ton tour de te laisser parler d'amour."

The birthday adaptation uses the familiar, informal and singular "tu" form French personal pronouns, in contrast with the original which uses "vous" pronouns which are either singular but formal, or plural (as with other Latin languages such as Spanish).

See also
 List of birthday songs

References 

1975 songs
Quebecois patriotic songs
Songs about birthdays
Gilles Vigneault songs
Songs written by Gilles Vigneault
Parti Québécois
Political party songs
Canadian anthems
Regional songs